The Parish of Milbang is a parish of Argyle County, New South Wales, Australia, located at 

The Parish is located close to the junction of the Federal Highway and Hume Highway and is 710m above sea level.
The area was first inhabited by the Gundungurra people, with White settlement  beginning in the 1840s.

References

Parishes of Argyle County
Southern Tablelands